Timotei is a shampoo brand owned by Unilever. The name Timotei comes from the Finnish word for a wild grass called timothy (timotei in Finnish). The Timotei brand was conceived and designed by Lintas Helsinki in Finland. Timotei shampoo was launched in the early 1980s, but some countries only sold Timotei for a short period. The tagline was 'So mild you can wash your hair as often as you like'.

Media
The early 1990s rock band Nelson were derisively nicknamed "the Timotei twins" by the British magazine Kerrang! for their waist-length blond hair.

In the episode "Parade" of the 1990s BBC comedy TV series Bottom, Richie (Rik Mayall) attempts to chat up a barmaid (Julia Sawalha) by asking her if she uses Timotei.

Timotei was featured in the Japanese anime Lucky Star, episode 6. The character Konata Izumi jokingly makes a reference to a Timotei commercial, and is disappointed with her friends' confusion, contrary to Yui's reaction.

In episode 6 of the BBC series Dead Boss, the main character Helen refers to being violated with a Timotei bottle while in prison.

References

External links
Official site

Shampoo brands
Unilever brands